Ben Hur is an unincorporated community in Lee County, Virginia, United States. It is located along U.S. Route 58 Alternate southwest of Pennington Gap and northeast of Jonesville. 

It is the location of Lee High School and Lee County's Walmart store.

History
Ben Hur was founded by Auburn Pridemore. He named the community after the novel Ben-Hur: A Tale of the Christ by Lew Wallace.

The Ben Hur post office was established in 1921.  The ZIP Code for Ben Hur is 24218.

References

Unincorporated communities in Lee County, Virginia
Unincorporated communities in Virginia